Hippopsis monachica is a species of beetle in the family Cerambycidae. It was described by Berg in 1889.

References

Hippopsis
Beetles described in 1889